Utkhulasu (Quechua utkhu cotton, local Quechua lasu (rasu) snow, ice, mountain with snow, also spelled Utculazo) is a mountain in the Andes of Peru which reaches a height of approximately . It is located in the Junín Region, in the Concepción Province, Cochas District, and in the Jauja Province, Apata District.

References 

Mountains of Peru
Mountains of Junín Region